Cross Cave, also named Cold Cave under Cross Mountain, is a cave in Slovenia's Lož Valley, in the area between the Lož Karst Field, Cerknica Karst Field, and Bloke Plateau. The cave is named after nearby Holy Cross Church in Podlož. The cave is particularly noted among Karst caves for its chain of over 45 subterranean lakes of emerald green water.  Extremely slow-growing calcareous formations (up to 0.1 mm per year) and their fragility are the main obstacle to large-scale tourism in the cave and limit daily tourist visits to the flooded part of the cave to four people. As a result, the Cross Cave is among the best-preserved caves, opened to the public in Slovenia. The cave was prepared for visits in the 1950s by the Lož Valley Tourist Association. It was later managed by the Ljubljana Cave Research Society. Since the 1990s, it has been cared for by the Friends of Cross Cave Association.
With 45 species of organisms, some not discovered until 2000, Cross Cave is the fourth-largest cave ecosystem in the world in terms of biodiversity. The cave was first documented in 1832, but the part of the cave that includes lakes and stream passages was first explored by Slovene cavers in 1926.

Course
At Calvary (the best-known symbol of Cross Cave), the cave splits into two branches: the Muds to the north and the Variegated Passage to the northeast. The passage through the Muds is more difficult, and so most visitors choose to continue through the Variegated Passage, which requires the use of small boats. Cross Cave continues into New Cross Cave. In the direction from the entrance to the cave, the Variegated Passage is the left gallery of Cross Cave at the confluence with the Muds at Cavalry. The access requires the use of boats. Part of the way along the Variegated Passage is a side gallery named the Matjaž Passage, and it contains several large columns. Continuing along the Variegated Passage, visitors enter the Crystal Mountain, the largest room in the cave. They can climb a mountainous pile of collapsed rocks to a point well above the stream.

Archeological site 

Cross cave exhibits one of the largest deposits of cave bear skeletons in this part of Europe. Over two thousand cave bear bones have been found in the cave. In addition to the abundance of cave bear bones, ceramic and lyrical remains from the eneolitic period were discovered in the entrance of the cave at the beginning of the first lake.

References

External links
 
 Cross Cave on Geopedia
 Cross Cave. Official webpage.
 Cross Cave. A map and a virtual panorama.

Limestone caves
Ecosystems
Show caves in Slovenia
Municipality of Bloke
Municipality of Cerknica
Municipality of Loška Dolina
Caves of Inner Carniola
Underground lakes